Adams Township is a township in Dallas County, Iowa, USA.  As of the 2000 census, its population was 1,082.

History
Adams Township is named for Stephen Adams, who was instrumental in the organization of this township.

Geography
According to the USGS, it contains four cemeteries: Ellis, Longmire, McKibben and Panther Creek.

The streams of Bear Creek, Coal Creek and Panther Creek run through this township.

Notes

References
 USGS Geographic Names Information System (GNIS)

External links
 US-Counties.com
 City-Data.com

Townships in Dallas County, Iowa
Townships in Iowa